In quantum mechanics, energy is defined in terms of the energy operator, acting on the wave function of the system as a consequence of time translation symmetry.

Definition

It is given by:

It acts on the wave function (the probability amplitude for different configurations of the system)

Application

The energy operator corresponds to the full energy of a system. The Schrödinger equation describes the space- and time-dependence of the slow changing (non-relativistic) wave function of a quantum system. The solution of this equation for a bound system is discrete (a set of permitted states, each characterized by an energy level) which results in the concept of quanta.

Schrödinger equation
Using the energy operator to the Schrödinger equation:

can be obtained:

Constant energy 
Working from the definition, a partial solution for a wavefunction of a particle with a constant energy can be constructed. In full,

where  is the partial solution of the wavefunction dependent on position. Applying the energy operator, we have

This is also known as the stationary state, and can be used to analyse the time-independent Schrödinger equation:

where E is an eigenvalue of energy.

Klein–Gordon equation

The relativistic mass-energy relation:

where again E = total energy, p = total 3-momentum of the particle, m = invariant mass, and c = speed of light, can similarly yield the Klein–Gordon equation:

where  is the momentum operator. That is:

Derivation

The energy operator is easily derived from using the free particle wave function (plane wave solution to Schrödinger's equation). Starting in one dimension the wave function is

By the De Broglie relation:

we have

Re-arranging the equation leads to

where the energy factor E is a scalar value, the energy the particle has and the value that is measured. The partial derivative is a linear operator so this expression is the operator for energy:

It can be concluded that the scalar E is the eigenvalue of the operator, while  is the operator. Summarizing these results:

For a 3-d plane wave

the derivation is exactly identical, as no change is made to the term including time and therefore the time derivative. Since the operator is linear, they are valid for any linear combination of plane waves, and so they can act on any wave function without affecting the properties of the wave function or operators. Hence this must be true for any wave function. It turns out to work even in relativistic quantum mechanics, such as the Klein–Gordon equation above.

See also

Time translation symmetry
Planck constant
Schrödinger equation
Momentum operator
Hamiltonian (quantum mechanics)
Conservation of energy
Complex number
Stationary state

References

Energy
Partial differential equations
Quantum mechanics